Crush is the seventh studio album by American rock band Bon Jovi. It was released on June 13, 2000, by Island Records. It was produced by Jon Bon Jovi, Richie Sambora, and Luke Ebbin. The album marks the longest timespan between studio albums for the band, with five years between the release of These Days (1995) and this album. After the initial plan to team up with producer Bruce Fairbairn fell through because of his death a year earlier, Bon Jovi and Sambora hired Luke Ebbin to update their sound with a smattering of loops and impressive arrangements.

Despite the long break, the album was just as successful as their previous releases and helped introduce the band to a new generation of fans. The success of the album was largely due to the lead single "It's My Life" which was nominated for a Grammy Award for Best Rock Performance by a Duo or Group with Vocal, while the album itself was nominated for Best Rock Album. Crush was certified double platinum in the United States by the Recording Industry Association of America.

Background
After a five-year hiatus, Jon Bon Jovi and Richie Sambora released solo albums. In 1999, Jon Bon Jovi was planning to release a third solo album but the band started work on their new album in the summer of 1999. Its working title was Sex Sells. Posters using this title are seen in and around New York in the video for "Real Life" – the band's then most recent single. Another working title was One Wild Night. The latter was resurrected for a live compilation the following year.

An initial plan to team up with producers Bob Rock and Bruce Fairbairn fell through because of the latter's death. An audition process was set up, but the band was uninterested by the producers interviewed. Eventually Bon Jovi asked A&R executive John Kalodner if he knew up-and-coming producers, and he recommended Luke Ebbin. He was brought to Bon Jovi's home studio in New Jersey, and took a demo with only vocals and acoustic guitar to add programming, string and background vocal arrangements. On his return, Ebbin was hired. The choice was fortuitous as it allowed Bon Jovi to update their sound with a smattering of loops and impressive arrangements.

Release and reception

Crush debuted at number 9 on the Billboard 200 on the issue dated July 1, 2000 with 115,000 copies sold in contrast to their last set, These Days (1995), which debuted with 73,000 units, it stayed at number nine for a week before dropping to number 29 and spent 51 weeks on the chart.  It was certified two times platinum by the RIAA, denoting shipments of two millions in the US.  As of March, 2009 the album has sold 2,071,000 copies in the United States according to Nielsen SoundScan. Crush debuted at No. 1 in the UK on June 10, 2000, and became the band's fifth consecutive UK No. 1 album, it stayed at the top of the chart for a week before dropping to number four, it remained on the chart for thirty nine weeks. It was certified platinum by the BPI on September 1, 2000, for shipments of 300,000 units. The album also topped the European Top 100 Albums chart for seven weeks, spent fifteen weeks in the Top 10, and received double platinum certification by the IFPI Europe. The album was No. 6 on the 2000 Europe Year-End albums chart and No. 7 on the 2000 worldwide year end albums chart. The first single also featuring a music video, "It's My Life" was the No. 3 best-selling single worldwide in 2000 and topped the European singles chart for 4 weeks. "Say It Isn't So" and "Thank You for Loving Me" were also released as singles for the album featuring music videos.

Crush was mostly well received by critics. It was the first Bon Jovi album ever to be nominated for a Grammy. In a review for AllMusic, Steve Huey expressed the opinion that Crush was a "solidly crafted mainstream rock record that's much better than most might expect." Rolling Stone Magazine gave the album 3 stars out of 5 and described "It's My Life" as "a Britney track shot through the heart with Richie Sambora's voice-box guitar." Entertainment Weekly gave it a B and said that "if the Jersey rockers haven't matured much, it hardly matters. Crush — for all its sappy ballads and suburban pop fairy tales — is classic Bon Jovi. And that's not an oxymoron."

Track listing 

At the end of the album, the band can be heard discussing what would happen if James Brown were there, which then follows into 30 seconds of silence before a bonus track, "I Could Make a Living Out of Loving You", can be heard.

Personnel 
Partial credits sourced from AllMusic.

Bon Jovi
 Jon Bon Jovi – vocals, producer
 Richie Sambora – guitars, talk box on "It's My Life", backing vocals, producer, co-lead vocals on "Say It Isn't So"
 David Bryan – keyboards
 Tico Torres – drums, percussion

Additional musicians
 Hugh McDonald – bass
 Michael Dearchin – backing vocals
 David Campbell – string arrangements

Production staff
 Luke Ebbin – producer
 Joe Chiccarelli – engineer, recording
 Mike Rew – assistant engineer
 Bob Clearmountain – mixing
 Sheldon Steiger – Pro Tools
 Olaf Heine – photography
 George Marino – mastering
 Obie O'Brien – engineer
 Kevin Reagan – design

Charts

Weekly charts

Year-end charts

Certifications

References

Bon Jovi albums
2000 albums
Albums produced by Richie Sambora
Albums produced by Luke Ebbin